Digital Chocolate, Inc. was a video game developer and publisher headquartered in San Mateo, California. It was founded in 2003 by Trip Hawkins, the founder of video game companies Electronic Arts and The 3DO Company. The company focused on developing games for Java ME-based mobile phones, iOS, and Microsoft Windows, and made some non-entertainment titles. Its marketing motto was Seize the minute.

The developer was officially closed in 2014. It has sold its games to RockYou, and its website was shut down.

History

Digital Chocolate was founded in 2003 by Hawkins after the failure of The 3DO Company. It had operations in San Mateo, Seattle, St. Petersburg, Bangalore, Helsinki, and Mexicali.

In 2004, Digital Chocolate acquired European developer Sumea, which then became its Helsinki studio.

On August 15, 2011, Digital Chocolate agreed to acquire Sandlot Games, a leading casual game developer and publisher.

In May 2012, Trip Hawkins stepped down as CEO to move to a "consulting and advisory relationship" with the company. The company also announced plans to lay off 180 employees.

Galaxy Life is its most successful title on Facebook to date, ranking at 284th bucket of MAU (Monthly Active Users) as of September 13, 2013.
 In 2013, Digital Chocolate's Barcelona studio was sold to Ubisoft with the Galaxy Life IP and the Helsinki studio was closed.

In April 2014, Digital Chocolate's four remaining Facebook games — Army Attack, Crazy Penguin Wars, Millionaire City, and Zombie Lane — were licensed to RockYou, along with the hiring of its developers to continue work on the games.

Games

 20Q: Celebrity Quiz
 20Q: Mind Reader
 20Q: Sports Quiz
 2D Brick Breaker Revolution
 3D Brick Breaker Revolution
 3D Rollercoaster Rush
 3D Mini Golf Challenge
 Army Attack
 Bubble Popper Deluxe
 Bumper Car City
 California Gold Rush (2009)
 California Gold Rush: Bonaza (2009-2010)
 Chocolate Shop Frenzy
 Crazy Monkey Spin
 Crazy Penguin Catapult (2007)
 Crazy Penguin Catapult 2 (2007-2009)
 Crazy Penguin Wars
 Crazy Penguin Assault (2011)
 Crazy Penguin Party (2009)
 Crazy Penguin Freezeway (2011)
 DChoc Cafe Hangman
 DChoc Cafe Solitaire
 Extreme Air Snowboarding
 Foto Quest Fishing 
 Galaxy Life
 Island God Beta
 Johnny Crash
 Johnny Crash Stuntman Does Texas

 Kamikaze Robots
 Kings & Warlords
 Mafia Wars
 Mafia Wars 2: Scarlottis
 Mafia Wars 3: Yakuza
 Millionaire City
 Minigolf Castles
 MMA Pro Fighter
 New in Town
 Nightclub Empire
 Party Island Bowling
 Party Island Pool
 Party Island: Sexy Trivia
 Petanque: World Tour
 Pyramid Bloxx (2007)
 Redbull X Fighters
 Rollercoaster Rush (2006)
 Rollercoaster Rush 3D (2007)
 Rollercoaster Rush New York (2008-2010)
 Rollercoaster Rush 99 Tracks (2008)
 Rollercoaster Rush Underground 3D (2010-2011)
 Racing Fever GT
 Super Water Bomber
 Strip Club Manager
 Tornado Mania! (2007)
 Tower Bloxx (2005)
 Tower Bloxx Deluxe  (2008)
 Tower Bloxx: New York (2009)
 Tower Bloxx: My City (2010)
 Tower Bloxx: Revolution (2011-2012)
 Santa's Tower Bloxx (2006)
Super Water Bomber
 Zombie Lane

Awards
In 2009, the company's game Brick Breaker Revolution won an IGN award for Best Artistic Design.

Mobile Entertainment named the company "best mobile games developer" in 2006 and 2007.

In 2006, Digital Chocolate received nine IGN Game of the Year awards. Its game Tornado Mania! was awarded Wireless Game of the Year with a "perfect 10" score, and the company was named Best Developer.

In 2012, the company's game Army Attack was nominated for the "Social Networking Game of the Year" in the Academy of Interactive Arts & Science's 15th Annual Interactive Achievement Awards.

The company has been included in The Red Herring Global 100.

References

External links
Official Website (archived via Wayback Machine)
DChoc Café Games Official Website
Digital Chocolate at MobyGames

Companies based in San Mateo, California
Video game companies established in 2003
Video game companies disestablished in 2014
Mobile game companies
Defunct video game companies of the United States
Video game development companies